Antanhol is a former civil parish in the municipality of Coimbra, Portugal. The population in 2011 was 2,556, in an area of 10.49 km2. On 28 January 2013 it merged with Assafarge to form Assafarge e Antanhol.

References 

Former parishes of Coimbra